Quipaipán was the name of the plains west of Cusco in Peru, famous for the Battle of Quipaipán in 1532 which decided the fate of the Inca Empire.

References
Rebecca M. Seaman. Conflict in the Early Americas: An Encyclopedia of the Spanish Empire's Aztec, Incan, and Mayan Conquests ABC-CLIO, Aug 27, 2013 pg. 183

Landforms of Cusco Region
Plains of South America